Elegant... and Dying is the second studio album by Australian Gothic-doom band Virgin Black. The album was released in June, 2003, on The End Records and Massacre Records. Various publications including The Village Voice praised the album.

Prior to the release of the album, the vocalist Rowan London trained with a professional opera singer, bolstering the album's operatic elements further.

Track listing
All songs written By Rowan London and Samantha Escarbe, except where otherwise noted.
 "Adorned in Ashes" – 6:18
 "Velvet Tongue" – 8:03/8:25 (Rowan London)
 "And the Kiss of God's Mouth (Part I)" – 1:26 (Samantha Escarbe)
 "And the Kiss of God's Mouth (Part II)" – 6:19
 "Renaissance" – 7:02
 "The Everlasting" – 17:13/19:57
 "Cult of Crucifixion" – 9:03
 "Beloved" – 7:27 (Samantha Escarbe)
 "Our Wings Are Burning" – 8:26

Personnel

Virgin Black
Rowan London – lead vocals, keyboards, piano, choir and chorus
Samantha Escarbe – guitar, cello, choir and chorus
Craig Edis – guitar, vocals 
Ian Miller – bass, choir and chorus
Dino Cielo – drums, choir and chorus

Additional personnel
Sonia Wilkie (guest) – violin
Brad and Stephanie Bessel, Carmen Harm, Terella Rosen – choir and chorus vocals

Production
Produced By Rowan London
Recorded By Carmen Harm and Aaron Nichols
Mixed By Carmen Harm

References

External links
Virgin Black official site
Encyclopaedia Metallum - Virgin Black - Elegant... and Dying retrieved 10–01–07

2003 albums
Virgin Black albums
The End Records albums